Ronald Peter Fabbro,  (born 6 November 1950) is the Roman Catholic Bishop of London, Ontario, Canada. He was born in Sudbury, Ontario, and was educated at St. Charles College and Queen's University.

Fabbro was the principal consecrator of Bishop Robert Anthony Daniels and Bishop William McGrattan, as well as a principal co-consecrator of Archbishop John Michael Miller.

Timeline
 6 Nov 1950, born in Sudbury, Ontario
 15 Aug 1975, professed as a member of the Congregation of St. Basil
 3 May 1980, ordained priest of the Congregation of St. Basil
 27 Apr 2002, appointed Bishop of London, Ontario, Canada
 15 Aug 2002, consecrated Bishop of London, Ontario, Canada

Handling of Sexual Abuse Scandal in the Diocese of London 
In September 2018, Bishop Fabbro released a statement stating that the "extent of the abuse is shocking".  He admitted that the "cover up" of sexual abuse by Roman Catholic dioceses was "terribly wrong". The statement was released in response to the media attention given to the Pennsylvania Grand Jury Report that involved an investigation of clergy sexual abuse.

In 2019, the Survivor's Network of those Abused by Priests (SNAP) confirmed that 36 priests were credibly accused of sexually abusing minors. Following media coverage of the list, the Diocese waived confidentiality of their previous settlements. When interviewed about the list compiled by SNAP, Bishop Fabbro indicated that the list was "substantially correct". He added that four other priests whose names were not on the list were accused of sexual abuse of minors. He refused to disclose the names of the priests. His decision faced considerable backlash from survivors and advocates.

In November 2019, Bishop Fabbro attended a screening of a documentary on clergy sexual abuse at the invitation of a survivor of clergy sexual abuse.

See also
Congregation of St. Basil

References

External links
 Catholic-Hierarchy profile
 Roman Catholic Diocese of London biography

1950 births
Roman Catholic bishops of London, Ontario
Living people
People from Greater Sudbury
Congregation of St. Basil